Quebrachos (Spanish : Departamento Quebrachos) is a department of Argentina in Santiago del Estero Province. The capital city of the department is situated in Sumampa.

References

Departments of Santiago del Estero Province